The Thailand one-satang coin is a currency unit equivalent to one-hundredth of a Thai baht. It is rare in circulation but used in banking transactions.

The first satang coin was issued from 1908 to 1937, and featured a hole through the middle. It was made of bronze and measured 22mm in diameter, weighing 4.6g. It bore the name of King Rama VI. A coin in the same design was minted in 1939 with name of King Rama VIII, and had a mintage of 24.4 million. In 1941 the design of the coin changed, although it was still bronze with a hole. The diameter changed to 20mm and the weight to 3.5g.

The hole was removed in 1942  as the coin's composition became tin, reducing its weight to 1.5g and the diameter to 15mm. Only issued in 1942, it had a mintage of 20.7 million. The design was changed on the coin, although it retained its specifications, in 1944. This coin had an issue of 500,000.

The coin then fell out of circulation. It was reintroduced in 1987 as an aluminium coin weighing 0.5g and measuring 15mm in diameter. This was the first one-satang coin to feature a portrait of a monarch, King Rama IX, which was sculpted by Wuthichai Saengngoen. A commemorative was released in 1996 to mark 50 years since of the reign of Rama IX, with a front-facing portrait of the King at his succession. In 2008, the current portrait of the King was inserted on the obverse.

Mintages 
 1987 ~ 93,000
 1988 ~ 200,000
 1989 ~ 109,000
 1990 ~ 191,050
 1991 ~ 25,000
 1992 ~ 61,000
 1993 ~ 126,000
 1994 ~ 500,000
 1995 ~ 500,000
 1996 - 0
 1997 ~ 10,000
 1998 ~ 10,000
 1999 ~ 20,000
 2000 ~ 10,000
 2001 ~ 50,000
 2002 - 0
 2003 ~ 10,000
 2004 ~ 10,000
 2005 ~ 20,000
 2006 ~ 3,000
 2007 ~ 10,000
 2008 ~ 10,000
 2009 ~ 10,000

References 

Coins of Thailand
One-cent coins